Foreign funding of NGOs (non-government organizations) is a controversial issue in some countries. In the late Cold War and afterward, foreign aid tended to be increasingly directed through NGOs, leading to an explosion of NGOs in the Global South reliant on international funding. Some critics of foreign funding of NGOs contend that foreign funding orients recipients toward donor priorities, making them less responsive to the communities they work in.

In 2013, a study published in Journal of Democracy surveyed 98 countries and found that "51 either prohibit (12) or restrict (39) foreign funding of civil society". Restrictions on foreign funding are more common in hybrid or authoritarian states than liberal democracies. The United Nations considers foreign funding of NGOs to be a right of freedom of association; however, critics argue that restrictions are justified in order to protect national sovereignty.

Background
In the late Cold War and afterward, foreign aid tended to be increasingly directed through NGOs, leading to an explosion of NGOs in the Global South reliant on international funding. Between 1994 and 2015, many countries passed laws limiting foreign funding of NGOs, which were usually justified by rhetoric of national sovereignty and the desire to ward off foreign influence. According to a 2019 study in Social Forces, "new funding laws are part of a growing backlash against the liberal international order", especially by illiberal and/or anti-Western governments. In 2006, Thomas Carothers termed this phenomenon "the backlash against democracy promotion", which he dates to Chinese and Russian restrictions in the early 2000s. In 2013, a study published in Journal of Democracy surveyed 98 countries and found that "51 either prohibit (12) or restrict (39) foreign funding of civil society".

By country

Africa

Egypt
A 2002 law restricted the activities of NGOs which received foreign funding, prohibiting them to engage in any political or policy related work. Egypt–United States relations were seriously disrupted by raids on NGOs which occurred in July 2011, several months after the overthrow of Hosni Mubarak. Civil society organizations had criticized the Supreme Council of the Armed Forces' handling of the power transfer. In 2013, 42 employees of various NGOs including Freedom House and the Konrad Adenauer Foundation were convicted of "operating an organization without a license and receiving illegal foreign funding".

Ethiopia
Ethiopia introduced restrictive anti-foreign NGO legislation, the Charities and Societies Proclamation, in 2009, but substantially relaxed it in 2019.

Kenya
In 2013, a Kenyan law which would have imposed a cap on foreign funding was rejected by the legislature. However, in 2014 President Uhuru Kenyatta stated that he would not allow "organizations advancing foreign interests to destabilize the government".

Nigeria
Foreign funding of NGOs, including newspapers, also occurs in Nigeria. Nigeria adopted a law restricting foreign funding in 2017, closely modeled on a similar law adopted by Sierra Leone in 2016. Freedom House stated that the law could lead to "improper state control of NGO programs, if not outright co-optation of NGOs".

Zimbabwe
Zimbabwe prohibits foreign NGOs from engaging in any work related to governance and limits the activities of local NGOs which accept foreign funding. In 2004, ZANU-PF passed a bill which would have banned foreign NGOs, which was not signed by the president.  Zimbabwe also cracked down on foreign NGOs prior to the 2008 and 2013 elections, claiming they were too involved in politics. Jeanne Elone wrote that Zimbabwe's constitutional guarantee of freedom of association is "obstructed by prohibitions against unregistered groups, complex registration procedures, vague grounds for denial, re-registration requirements, and barriers for international organizations".

Americas

Nicaragua
A study of NGOs in Nicaragua concluded that foreign funding increased professionalization, and caused NGOs to focus more on delivering services than policial activism, compared to grassroots membership organizations.

Venezuela
In 2006, Venezuela rejected a law which would have forbidden foreign funding of NGOs entirely. A less restrictive law was passed in 2010. In the interim, Venezuela redirected its foreign policy and was no longer allied with countries which disapproved of such restrictions.

Asia

Cambodia
A study of foreign funding in NGOs operating in Cambodia found that donors prefer organizations with more professionalization, but do not prioritize those which have strong grassroots connections and local legitimacy.

India
Foreign Contribution (Regulation) Act, 2010 is the law that governs foreign funding in India  According to a 2014 Intelligence Bureau report, certain NGOs (such as Greenpeace, Cordaid, Amnesty International, and Action Aid) reduced India's GDP by a few percent each year. The Modi government cancelled the licenses of almost 20,000 NGOs by 2018, which led to a 40% reduction in foreign funding to NGOs.

Israel
Israel has laws requiring NGOs to disclose the source of their funds. Certain left-wing NGOs receive disproportionate funding from the European Union and Western European countries, which is perceived by opponents to undermine the policies of Israel's democratically elected government.

Europe

Hungary
In 2017, Hungary passed Law No LXXVI of 2017 on the Transparency of Organisations which receive Support from Abroad, which restricted foreign funding of NGOs. On 18 June 2020, the European Court of Justice ruled that the law violated European Union law by "introduc[ing] discriminatory and unjustified restrictions", violating free movement of capital and other guaranteed rights.

Poland
In May 2020, Law and Justice environment minister Michal Wos announced that the Polish government was considering a law to require NGOs to disclose foreign funding, because "Poles have a right to know whether they are indeed organisations that work in the interests of Poles". The proposed law was criticized by the opposition; critics argued that the government was trying to suppress criticism.

Russia
The Russian foreign agent law requires foreign-funded NGOs to register as "foreign agents", a Soviet-era dysphemism for Soviet dissidents.

Georgia
On 7 March 2023, the Georgian Parliament passed the Law on Transparency of Foreign Influence in the first reading, which requires NGOs receiving foreign funding to register as "agents of foreign influence" if the foreign support amounts to 20% of their total revenue. The bill requires NGOs to disclose the source of their funds but does not imposes any restriction on their activities. The draft law was criticized by the US State Department, United Nations and European Union. The proposed law caused protests, due  to which the parliament suspended further discussions of the bill.

Pros and cons
Restrictions on foreign funding of NGOs are more common in hybrid or authoritarian states compared to liberal democracies.

In 2013, the United Nations Special Rapporteur on the Rights to Freedom of Peaceful Assembly and of Association, Maina Kiai, stated that "The right to freedom of association includes the right to seek, receive and use resources – human, material and financial – from domestic, foreign, and international sources." In 2014, The Economist reported that "More and more autocrats are stifling criticism by barring non-governmental organisations from taking foreign cash", citing Hungary as an example.

A 2020 study found that African countries which allowed foreign funding of NGOs had a higher voter turnout; the authors argued that this effect was because laws against foreign funding implied a democratic recession.

A 2015 study found that local human rights organizations in non-repressive developing countries often relied on international funding as the path of least resistance instead of seeking local funding. The authors of the study also stated that "excessive reliance on foreign aid is rarely healthy over the long term; it can easily weaken, distort, and divide domestic civil societies".

One argument against foreign funding is that it might cause NGOs to reorient their objectives to what donors are looking for at the moment, at the cost of local priorities (mission drift). However, foreign funding might not have as strong a crowding out effect as local government spending because the money is coming from foreigners, rather than tax money.

Supporters of foreign funding restrictions argue that they undermine national sovereignty and that NGOs may push political agendas while claiming to be neutral. Because foreign-funded NGOs are accountable to foreign donors rather than local communities or voters, with a lack of democratic checks and balances, they lack accountability from citizens of the countries that they operate in. Shaoguang Wang has argued that, "foreign donors often use their own preferences, priorities, and concern rather than local needs to dictate which types of local NGOs will  dominate  the  scene". John Feffer stated that "Civic groups committed to universal values  will sometimes (inadvertently or deliberately) work on behalf of the interests of foreign states."

Neo-Marxists have argued that foreign NGOs use their money to promote neoliberal policies that benefit United States and European elites at the expense of anti-imperialism.

See also
 Foreign agent

References

Non-governmental organizations
Foreign intervention
Freedom of association